{{Taxobox
| name = Marinobacterium zhoushanense
| domain = Bacteria
| phylum = Pseudomonadota
| classis = Gammaproteobacteria
| ordo = Alteromonadales
| familia = Alteromonadaceae
| genus = Marinobacterium
| species = M. zhoushanense| binomial = Marinobacterium zhoushanense| binomial_authority = Han et al. 2016
| type_strain = CGMCC 1.15341, KCTC 42782, WM3
| subdivision = 
| synonyms = 
}}Marinobacterium zhoushanense'  is a Gram-negative, facultatively anaerobic and motile bacterium from the genus of Marinobacterium'' with a single polar flagellum which has been isolated from seawater from the East China Sea.

References

External links
Type strain of Marinobacterium zhoushanense at BacDive -  the Bacterial Diversity Metadatabase

 

Alteromonadales
Bacteria described in 2016